The women's individual compound competition at the 2001 World Archery Championships took place in September 2001 in Beijing, China. 57 archers entered the competition. Following a qualifying 144 arrow FITA round, the archers were drawn for the 6-round knockout tournament according to their qualification round scores, with the top 7 archers receiving byes to the second round. The semi-finals and finals then took place on 23 September.

Qualifying
The following archers were the leading 8 qualifiers:

Finals

References

2001 World Archery Championships
World
Arch